HMS Viscount  was a V-class destroyer (Thornycroft V and W class) of the British Royal Navy that saw service in the final months of World War I and in World War II.

Construction and commissioning
Viscount, the first Royal Navy ship of the name, was ordered either on 30 June 1916 or in July 1916 (sources differ) as part of the 9th Order of the 1916–1917 Naval Programme and was laid down by John I. Thornycroft & Company at Woolston, Hampshire, England, on 20 December 1916. Although broadly similar, Viscount was one of only two V-Class destroyers built by Thornycrofts. HMS Viscount differed in a number of ways to other V-Class destroyers and was notably faster. Launched on 29 December 1917, she was completed on 4 March 1918 and commissioned the same day. Her original pennant number, F99, was changed first to G06  and then in April 1918 to G24; it was changed to D92 during the interwar period.

Service history

First World War
Upon completion, Viscount was assigned to the Grand Fleet, based at Scapa Flow in the Orkney Islands, in which she served for the rest of World War I. Viscount rapidly gained a reputation as an exceptionally fast ship and successfully attacked and sank at least one German U-boat which was caught on the surface. HMS Viscount was signalled to attack at full speed. The U-boat spoilt the aim of Viscounts forward battery by submerging full-speed astern. Viscount steamed over the U-boat and destroyed it by depth charges. HMS Viscount also participated in several cruises/escorts to Murmansk and Archangel during this period. Other actions included the interception and seizing of Bolshevik-controlled Russian warships in support of White Russian forces.

Interwar
After the conclusion of World War I, Viscount served in the Atlantic Fleet. The ships crossed the North Sea and transited the Kaiser Wilhelm Canal to enter the Baltic, where they called at Danzig in the Free City of Danzig; Memel in the Klaipėda Region; Liepāja, Latvia; Riga, Latvia; Tallinn, Estonia; Helsinki, Finland; Stockholm, Sweden; Copenhagen, Denmark; Gothenburg, Sweden; and Kristiania, Norway, before crossing the North Sea and ending the voyage at Port Edgar, Scotland, on 15 October 1921.

Viscount later served in the Mediterranean Fleet before being assigned to duties in home waters. She was attached to the 1st Submarine Flotilla in 1938.

Second World War

1939–1940
When the United Kingdom entered World War II on 3 September 1939, Viscount was deployed with the 19th Destroyer Flotilla, based at Plymouth, for convoy escort and patrol duty in the English Channel and Southwestern Approaches. In January 1940, she was reassigned to the Western Approaches Command but continued her escort and patrol operations from Plymouth. On 18 February 1940, Viscount and Vanquisher relieved a French warship as the escort for Convoy HG 18 during the final portion of its voyage from Gibraltar to Liverpool, detaching to return to Plymouth when it arrived at Liverpool on 19 February 1940. In April, Western Approaches Command moved its headquarters to Liverpool, and as a result Viscounts base was changed from Plymouth to Liverpool.

In May 1940, Viscounts pennant number was changed to I92. That month, she was assigned to operations related to the Norwegian Campaign in the aftermath of the April 1940 German invasion of Norway and Denmark. Later that day, the destroyers rendezvoused with the troopships – carrying Allied personnel evacuated from Norway as the campaign there ended in the German conquest of the country – and the repair ship  and took them under escort to the Clyde. The convoy came under attack by German aircraft on 8 June 1940, but the escorts drove the German planes off.

Viscount returned to her North Atlantic convoy escort duty in July 1940.
while they laid mines in the Northern Barrage in Operation SN42.

Detaching from HG 47, she rendezvoused with Convoy HX 90 – 41 ships bound from Halifax, Nova Scotia, Canada, to Liverpool – as its escort on 1 December 1940. Later that day, HX 90 came under attack by the first of six German submarines, which sank 10 of its ships on 1 and 2 December. The sinkings stopped only after Viscount and the Royal Canadian Navy destroyer  conducted 13 depth-charge attacks on asdic contacts over the course of four hours on 2 December, keeping the submarines submerged and unable to attack until HX 90 had left the area. Viscount then escorted HX 90 the rest of the way to Liverpool, where it arrived on 5 December 1940.

1941–1942

Viscount continued on convoy escort duty in the North Atlantic until June 1941, when she began conversion to a Long-Range Escort at Liverpool. With the conversion complete, she underwent post-conversion acceptance trials and, having passed them, performed work-ups in December 1941 to prepare for her return to convoy duty, which she did later that month.

In March 1942, Viscount was "adopted" by the civilian community of Chislehurst and Sidcup in Kent in a Warship Week national savings campaign. In May 1942, she escorted Convoy SC 83 with the group. By June–July 1942, she had had Type 271 surface warning radar and a Hedgehog antisubmarine mortar installed.

On 13 August 1942, Viscount was part of the escort of Convoy ONS 122 when it came under a series of sustained attacks by German submarines of the "Lohs" group. On 23 August, she intercepted communications from one of the submarines, got a fix on its location, detected it with asdic after it submerged, and attacked it. By the time attacks on ONS 122 ended, it had lost four ships and its escorts had damaged two German submarines.

In October 1942, Viscount was part of the escort of Convoy SC 1 CW, which came under attack by 10 German submarines of the "Wotan" (Wōden) group. On 15 October, while defending the convoy, Viscount detected the submarine U-607 on radar and attacked her unsuccessfully. Viscount then rammed and thereafter sank the submarine by gun fire and a heavy depth charge. Viscount suffered significant damage in the ramming and had to detach from the convoy and proceed to the United Kingdom for repairs.

1943–1945
Viscounts repairs were completed in February 1943, and she rejoined the 6th Escort Group that month in time to join the escort of Convoy ONS 165, which came under attack from German submarines of the "Taifun" ("Typhoon") group. U-201 sank with the loss of her entire crew of 49, and Viscount again suffered significant damage, requiring repairs that lasted through April 1943.

In May 1943, Viscount returned to North Atlantic convoy duty. The submarine submerged, and Viscount attacked it with depth charges, but without success.

Over the course of the summer of 1943, Viscount was detached for Operation Derange, consisting of offensive antisubmarine operations in the Bay of Biscay in which aircraft and ships cooperated in attacks on German submarines transiting the bay between their bases in German-occupied France and the Atlantic shipping routes. She continued operations in support of Alacrity into October 1943.

Viscount returned to Atlantic convoy duty in October 1943, continuing it without further major incident into the early weeks of 1945, when she also began convoy escort operations in British coastal waters. In order to free up her crew members to man newer, more modern escort ships, she was withdrawn from operations in February 1945 and decommissioned in March 1945.

Decommissioning and disposal
Viscount was sold on 20 March 1945 to BISCO for scrapping by Clayton and Davie at Dunston. She arrived at the shipbreakers yard on 27 May 1947.

Notes

Bibliography

External links

 Blueprints of HMS Viscount

 

V and W-class destroyers of the Royal Navy
1917 ships
World War I destroyers of the United Kingdom
World War II destroyers of the United Kingdom
Ships built by John I. Thornycroft & Company